Leonard Michael Collard (born 24 December 1959) is a Noongar elder, professor and Australian Research Council chief investigator at the School of Indigenous Studies, University of Western Australia.

Collard is a Whadjuk/Balardong Noongar, the traditional owners of the Perth region of Western Australia. He has a background in literature and communications, and has researched areas including Noongar interpretive histories and Noongar theoretical and practical research models.

In 2011 Collard commenced a three-year study of Noongar place names and intends to create a public website of 25,000 Noongar words for different places around the South West of Western Australia. In 2014 he announced his project to create the world's first online Aboriginal encyclopaedia, Noongarpedia, to preserve the endangered Noongar language.

Publications
 Mooro nyungar katitijin bidi - Mooro peoples knowledge trail : interpretation of the City of Stirling Local Government Area literature review. Leonard Collard, Angela Rooney and Laura Stocker, 2014
 Nartji katitj bidi ngulluckiny korrl? : (which knowledge path will we travel?). Len Collard and Sandra Harben, 2010.
 Beeliar Boodjar : an introduction to the Aboriginal history of the City of Cockburn based on existing literature. Leonard Collard and Clint Bracknall, 2001.
 Nyittiny : cosmology of the Nuyngar of South-Western Australia. Leonard Collard, 2008
 Aboriginal young people in the southeast of Western Australia : implications for youth policy. Len Collard and Dave Palmer, 1991.

External links
 Len Collard - Who are you? Collard's story in his own words - ABC Radio Perth recorded 5 July 2017

References

Academic staff of the University of Western Australia
Noongar elders
1959 births
Living people
People from Pingelly, Western Australia